Wilayat Ali (1885–1918; pen name Bambooque) was an Indian satirist who wrote in both Urdu and English. He was born in Masauli, Uttar Pradesh and studied at the Muhammadan Anglo-Oriental College. He was a staunch critic of British rule of the Indian subcontinent, often writing in The Comrade and New Era.

References

Indian satirists
1885 births
1918 deaths
Muhammadan Anglo-Oriental College alumni